Allium maackii is a species of wild onion native to northeastern Asia (Heilongjiang, Amur Oblast, Primorye, Khabarovsk, Sakhalin, Kuril Islands). It is found on cliff and steep hillsides at elevations of 200–500 m.

Allium maackii has cylindrical to egg-shaped bulbs up to 15 mm across. Scapes are up to 50 cm tall. Leaves are flat and narrow. Umbel has many flowers crowded together, each rose pink with a dark purple midstripe.

References

maackii
Onions
Flora of the Russian Far East
Flora of Manchuria
Plants described in 1931